Adelmar Faria Coimbra-Filho (June 4, 1924 – June 27, 2016) was a Brazilian biologist and primatologist. He is a pioneer in studies of and conservation of lion tamarins. He is founder and Former Director of the Rio de Janeiro Primate Centre. Coimbra Filho's titi is named after him.

Life and career
Coimbra-Filho was born in Fortaleza. He began his career in 1947. He rediscovered the black lion tamarin, and assisted in conservation of the golden lion tamarin through a zoo-based breeding program in collaboration with Devra G. Kleiman.

His awards and honors include the Augusto Ruschi Award from the Brazilian Academy of Sciences.

References

External links
Adelmar Faria Coimbra-Filho via Brazilian Academy of Sciences 

1924 births
2016 deaths
Brazilian biologists
Primatologists